The Lady in the Morgue is a 1938 American mystery film directed by Otis Garrett and written by Eric Taylor and Robertson White. It is based on the 1936 novel The Lady in the Morgue by Jonathan Latimer. The film stars Preston Foster, Patricia Ellis, Frank Jenks, Thomas E. Jackson, Wild Bill Elliott, Roland Drew and Barbara Pepper. The film was released on April 22, 1938, by Universal Pictures.

Plot
Detective Bill Crane investigates the murder of the morgue keeper and the disappearance of a blond's dead body.

Cast

Production
In 1937, Universal Pictures made a deal with the Crime Club, who were published of whodunnits. Over the next few years Universal released several mystery films in the series. The film was the third in Universal's Crime Club series.

Reception
From retrospective reviews, the authors of the book Universal Horrors stated that the film was a "confusing yarn" and that "all the ingredients for a crackerjack mystery thriller are here, but somewhere along the line, this inconsequential meller misses the mark."

References

Footnotes

Sources

External links
 

1938 films
American mystery films
1938 mystery films
Universal Pictures films
American black-and-white films
Films directed by Otis Garrett
1930s English-language films
1930s American films